Daniel Keyes (August 9, 1927 – June 15, 2014) was an American writer who wrote the novel Flowers for Algernon. Keyes was given the Author Emeritus honor by the Science Fiction and Fantasy Writers of America in 2000.

Biography

Early life and career
Keyes was born in New York City, New York. His family was Jewish. He attended New York University briefly before joining the United States Maritime Service at 17, working as a ship's purser on oil tankers. Afterward he returned to New York and in 1950 received a bachelor's degree in psychology from Brooklyn College.

A month after graduation, Keyes joined publisher Martin Goodman's magazine company, Magazine Management. He eventually became an editor of their pulp magazine Marvel Science Stories (cover-dated Nov. 1950 – May 1952) after editor Robert O. Erisman, and began writing for the company's comic-book lines Atlas Comics, the 1950s precursors of Marvel Comics. After Goodman ceased publishing pulps in favor of paperback books and men's adventure magazines, Keyes became an associate editor of Atlas under editor-in-chief and art director Stan Lee. Circa 1952, Keyes was one of several staff writers, officially titled editors, who wrote for such horror and science fiction comics as Journey into Unknown Worlds, for which Keyes wrote two stories with artist Basil Wolverton.

As Keyes recalled, Goodman offered him a job under Lee after Marvel Science Stories ceased publication:

One story idea Keyes wrote but did not submit to Lee was called "Brainstorm", the paragraph-long synopsis that would evolve into Flowers for Algernon. It begins: "The first guy in the test to raise the I.Q. from a low normal 90 to genius level ... He goes through the experience and then is thrown back to what was." Keyes recalled, "something told me it should be more than a comic book script."

From 1955 to 1956, Keyes wrote for EC Comics, including its titles Shock Illustrated and Confessions Illustrated, under both his own name and the pseudonyms Kris Daniels and A.D. Locke.

Flowers for Algernon

The short story and subsequent novel, Flowers for Algernon, is written as progress reports of a mentally disabled man, Charlie, who undergoes experimental surgery and briefly becomes a genius before the effects tragically wear off. The story was initially published in the April 1959 issue of The Magazine of Fantasy & Science Fiction and the expanded novel in 1966. The novel has been adapted several times for other media, most prominently as the 1968 film Charly, starring Cliff Robertson (who won an Academy Award for Best Actor) and Claire Bloom. Keyes also won the Hugo Award in 1959 and the Nebula Award in 1966 for the story.

Later career
Keyes taught creative writing at Wayne State University, and in 1966 he became an English and creative writing professor at Ohio University, in Athens, Ohio, where he was honored as a professor emeritus in 2000.

Death
Keyes died at his home in Boca Raton on June 15, 2014, due to complications from pneumonia. His wife Aurea Georgina Vazquez, whom he married in 1952, had died in 2013. They had two daughters.

Awards

Won 
 1960: Hugo Award for the story "Flowers for Algernon"
 1966: Nebula Award for the novel Flowers for Algernon
 1986: Kurd Lasswitz Award for The Minds of Billy Milligan
 1993: Seiun Award (Non-Fiction of the Year) for The Minds of Billy Milligan
 2000: Author Emeritus Award from Science Fiction and Fantasy Writers of America
 2014: Life Time Award

Nominated 
 1967: Hugo Award for the novel Flowers for Algernon
 1982: Edgar Award for Best Fact Crime for The Minds of Billy Milligan
 1987: Edgar Award for the American Association of Mystery Writers for Unveiling Claudia

Bibliography

Novels 
 Flowers for Algernon (novel, 1966) adapted for cinema as Charly, 1968, and as Flowers for Algernon, 2000
 The Touch (1968; re-edited and published as The Contaminated Man, 1977)
 The Fifth Sally (1980)
 The Minds of Billy Milligan (1981)
 Unveiling Claudia (1986)
 The Milligan Wars: A True-Story Sequel (Japan, 1994)
 Until Death (1998)
 The Asylum Prophecies (2009)

Short fiction 
Collections
 Daniel Keyes Collected Stories (Japan, 1993)
Stories

Non-fiction

References

External links
 
 
 
 

1927 births
2014 deaths
20th-century American male writers
20th-century American novelists
20th-century American short story writers
21st-century American male writers
21st-century American non-fiction writers
21st-century American novelists
21st-century American short story writers
American comics writers
American magazine editors
American male non-fiction writers
American male novelists
American male short story writers
American military personnel of World War II
American psychological fiction writers
American sailors
American science fiction writers
Brooklyn College alumni
Deaths from pneumonia in Florida
EC Comics
Hugo Award-winning writers
Jewish American novelists
Marvel Comics people
Military personnel from New York City
Military personnel from New York (state)
Nebula Award winners
Novelists from Michigan
Novelists from New York (state)
Novelists from Ohio
Ohio University faculty
The Magazine of Fantasy & Science Fiction people
Wayne State University faculty
Writers from Brooklyn
United States Merchant Mariners
United States Merchant Mariners of World War II